Phillipa Lowe (born 7 April 1992) is a British track and field athlete who specialises in the 400 metres, 400 metres hurdles and the 4 x 400 metres relay. She won a silver medal representing Great Britain at the 2017 European Athletics Indoor Championships in Belgrade.

Personal bests

References 

1992 births
Living people